Sanjiv Bajaj (born 2 November 1969) is an Indian businessman and Chairman MD & CEO of Bajaj Finserv.

Early life and education 
Born into the Bajaj family, Sanjiv is the great-grandson of founder Jamnalal Bajaj and the younger son of Bajaj Group chairman, Rahul Bajaj. He completed his schooling at a Catholic convent school run by the Swiss missionaries. He then pursued his mechanical engineering degree from the University of Pune, masters degree in manufacturing systems engineering from the University of Warwick, and a management degree from Harvard Business School. Sanjiv is married to Shefali Bajaj and has two kids.

Career 

Bajaj began his career in 1994 with Bajaj Auto. During his years at Bajaj Auto, he dabbled in various roles, including heading finance, legal & international business functions within the organisation. He was credited in bringing American-style supply chain management in the Bajaj Auto using General Motors as a model. Currently, he is serving as the non-executive director of Bajaj Auto.

After Bajaj Auto's demerger in 2007, Sanjiv took charge as the managing director of Bajaj Finserv. He took over additional roles like the chairman of Bajaj Allianz Life Insurance and Bajaj Allianz General Insurance, vice chairman of Bajaj Finance, and managing director of Bajaj Holdings & Investment Limited in the year 2012. By 2017, under his leadership, Bajaj Allianz General Insurance became the 2nd most profitable insurance company in India.

Sanjiv was the deputy chairman of Confederation of Indian Industry (CII) Western Region for 2018-19. He was also elected as the chairman of CII Western Region for 2019-20. For 2020-21, he was elected as the vice president of CII. In June 2021, he got elected as the President Designate of CII for 2021-22. and in May 2022, he took charge as the President of CII for 2022-23.

Currently, he is the chairman and managing director of Bajaj Finserv. He was reappointed as managing director for five years in May 2022.

As a part of Confederation of Indian Industry's B20 India Secretariat, Bajaj is appointed as one of the B20 India participants, a position in which he will be a part of a group that will lead the business agenda during India's G-20 presidency.

Controversies 
In January 2022, Bajaj and his top management was threatened by a hacker for a possible cyber security attack on his group companies.

Awards 
 Transformational Leader Award (large-cap category) 2017 at the Asian Center's Leadership, Corporate Governance, Sustainability & CSR Awards.
 Ernst & Young Entrepreneur of the Year Award 2017.
 Economic Times Awards for Business Leader of the Year 2018.
 All India Management Association's Managing India Awards - Entrepreneur of the Year 2019.
 Financial Express– Banker of the Year 2019.

References 

Living people
1969 births
Businesspeople from Pune
Indian billionaires
Marwari people
Harvard Business School alumni
Savitribai Phule Pune University alumni
Bajaj Group
Sanjiv